James C. Cooney was a sergeant of the U.S. Army in the 8th U.S. Cavalry when he found large silver and gold reserves in the Mogollon Mountains of Catron County, New Mexico. He was transferred to Fort Bayard, near Silver City, New Mexico in 1870. While scouting for the 8th U.S. Cavalry north of Mogollon and east of Alma, he discovered silver ore in the Mogollon Mountains. He began working the claim after leaving the Army in 1876.
 

During a raid on settlers' homes in the Alma Massacre in 1880, Cooney was killed by local Chiricahua Apache led by Victorio.

See also 

 Cooney's Tomb
 Cooney, New Mexico

References

History of Catron County, New Mexico
People from New Mexico
United States Army soldiers